Eubulus (Euboulos) was an Athenian Middle Comedy poet, victorious six times at the Lenaia, first probably in the late 370s or 360s BC (IG II2 2325.144; just before Ephippus)

According to the Suda (test. 1), which dates him to the 101st Olympiad (i.e. 376/2) and identifies him as "on the border between the Middle and the Old Comedy", he produced 104 comedies and won six victories at the Lenaia. An obscure notice in a scholium on Plato (test. 4) appears to suggest that some of his plays were staged by Aristophanes’ son Philippus. He attacked Philocrates, Callimedon, Cydias, and Dionysius the tyrant of Syracuse.

Eubulus's plays were chiefly about mythological subjects and often parodied the tragic playwrights, especially Euripides.

Surviving titles and fragments
150 fragments (including three dubia) of his comedies survive, along with fifty-eight titles: 

Ancylion
Anchises
Amaltheia
Anasozomenoi ("Men Who Were Trying To Get Home Safe")
Antiope
Astytoi ("Impotent Men")
Auge
Bellerophon
Ganymede
Glaucus
Daedalus
Danae
Deucalion
Dionysius
Dolon
Eirene ("Peace")
Europa
Echo
Ixion
Ion
Kalathephoroi ("Basket-Bearers")
Campylion
Katakollomenos ("The Man Who Was Glued To the Spot")
Cercopes
Clepsydra
Korydalos ("The Lark")
Kybeutai ("Dice-Players")
Lakones ("Spartans") or Leda
Medea
Mylothris ("The Mill-Girl")
Mysians
Nannion
Nausicaa
Neottis
Xuthus
Odysseus or Panoptai ("Men Who See Everything")
Oedipus
Oenimaus or Pelops
Olbia
Orthannes
Pamphilus
Pannychis ("The All-Night Festival")
Parmeniscus
Pentathlos ("The Pentathlete")
Plangon
Pornoboskos ("The Pimp")
Procris
Prosousia or Cycnus
Semele or Dionysus
Skyteus ("The Shoemaker")
Stephanopolides ("Female Garland-Vendors")
Sphingokarion ("Sphinx-Carion")
Titans
Tithai or Titthe ("Wet-Nurses" or Wet-Nurse")
Phoenix
Charites ("The Graces")
Chrysilla
Psaltria ("The Harp-Girl")

The standard edition of the fragments and testimonia is in Rudolf Kassel and Colin François Lloyd Austin's Poetae Comici Graeci Vol. V. The eight-volume Poetae Comici Graeci produced from 1983 to 2001 replaces the outdated collections Fragmenta Comicorum Graecorum by August Meineke (1839-1857), Comicorum Atticorum Fragmenta by Theodor Kock (1880-1888) and Comicorum Graecorum Fragmenta by Georg Kaibel (1899).

Richard L. Hunter offers a careful study of Eubulus’ career and the fragments of his plays in Eubulus: The Fragments (Cambridge, 1983).

4th-century BC Athenians
Ancient Greek dramatists and playwrights
4th-century BC writers
Middle Comic poets
Year of birth unknown
Year of death unknown